Angie Paola Ponce Baque (born 14 July 1996) is an Ecuadorian semi-professional footballer. She was part of the Ecuadorian squad for the 2015 FIFA Women's World Cup. Ponce holds the record for being the first, and only, player to have scored two own goals in a Women's World Cup match. In the 2015 World Cup, she scored two own goals in a single game against Switzerland in their Group C match on 12 June. However, in the same game, she scored a penalty which was the first ever Women's World Cup goal for Ecuador.

References

External links
 
 Profile  at FEF
 

1996 births
Living people
People from Guayaquil
Ecuadorian women's footballers
Ecuador women's international footballers
Place of birth missing (living people)
2015 FIFA Women's World Cup players
Women's association football defenders
Footballers at the 2015 Pan American Games
Pan American Games competitors for Ecuador
21st-century Ecuadorian women